is a Japanese historical work compiled, in part, by the early Heian period scholar , grandson of Ōe no Otondo, who had been one of the compilers of the Montoku Jitsuroku. After Asatsuna's death in 957, his cousin Ōe no Koretoki became the head compiler. It categorizes and chronologizes the events listed in the Six National Histories.

Because of the differences in size, lack of a formal title, and that no record of a presentation of the work survives, it is believed that the Shinkokushi was an unfinished manuscript. As a manuscript, the entirety of the Shinkokushi does not survive but instead portions of it have been passed down in other works.

Notes

Late Old Japanese texts
10th-century Japanese books
History books about Japan
10th century in Japan
History books of the Heian Period